Leslie Porterfield was named as the 2008 American Motorcyclist Association (AMA) Racing Female Rider of the Year, holds three land-speed records and is a member of the Bonneville 200 mph club. She is the former co-owner of High Five Cycles with Alan Lamb, a used motorcycle dealership in north Dallas.  She has been riding and racing motorcycles since her mid-teens. She was born on April 16, 1976.

Leslie Porterfield was previously the Guinness Book of World Records' "Fastest conventional motorcycle speed (female)" with her land speed record of  set at Bonneville Speedway in 2008. That record was broken in 2019 and is now held by Erin Sills at 381.857 km/h (237.275 mph).

The trials and tribulations of obtaining her record at Speedweek were documented for the Discovery Channel show "Speed Capital of the World: Bonneville".

Leslie Porterfield is writing for Motorbikes India online magazine.

References

Living people
1976 births
Sportspeople from Dallas
American motorcycle racers
Female motorcycle racers
Insurance agents
Motorcycle land speed record people
Bonneville 200 MPH Club members
American sportswomen
21st-century American women